Joe Pica (September 19, 1923 – December 13, 1973), nicknamed "The Wizard of the Keys," was a popular United States East Coast pianist and lounge singer who flourished in the 1950s.

Life and work
A native of New Jersey, Joseph Pica was the son of James Pica, a taylor, who had immigrated from Italy in 1899, and his wife Safira, who had been born in the U.S. but was of Italian descent. Joseph was the youngest of four siblings.

He may have graduated from Abington Avenue Elementary School in Newark, New Jersey, and attended Barringer High School, also in Newark. According to one source, "At the age of nine he presented two successful classical concerts but in his early teens he switched from classical to pop style."

For thirteen years, Pica had his own radio show on WAAT in Newark. To promote The Jolson Story (1946), a theater owner in Newark hired Pica to play Jolson songs on the radio for three weeks prior to the film's debut. Free tickets were given to those who could guess the names of the songs.

In the 1950s, Pica recorded more than a dozen singles and at least one album, all issued by either Original Records or Bergen Records in Little Ferry, New Jersey or Anchor Records in Newark. Four of his records made the Music Vendor pop charts, 1954-58.

In about 1960, by that time married to Eva, Pica moved to Florida, where he played piano at the Crystal Lounge in Clearwater before becoming the owner of Joe Pica Red Carpet Steak House and Lounge.

He died in 1973, shortly after his 50th birthday.

Joe Pica the pianist is sometimes confused with Joe Picca (1919–1979) who had an accordion shop in Bound Brook, New Jersey, and composed piano accordion solos.

Personal recollections of Pica

Discography

Singles
 "Back in the Good Old Days" / "Springtime in the Rockies" (with Shorty Warren and the Arlene Wright Trio) (78 rpm, Trope 5154, c. 1951)
 "Go Home, Little Girl, Go Home" (with The Song Spinners) / "Memories" (45 rpm, Anchor 45-A-6, August 1952)
"Margie" / "When I Grow Too Old to Dream" (45 rpm, Anchor 45-A-18, 1953)
 "Please Don't Talk About Me When I'm Gone" / "Caravan" (Instrumental) (45 rpm, Original OR-511, c. 1954)
 "The Music Goes 'Round and Around" / "Chinatown, My Chinatown" (Instrumental) (45 rpm, Original OR-512, February 1955)
 "I Learned a Lesson I'll Never Forget" / "Doodle Doo Doo" (with the Balladairs Group) (45 rpm, Original OR-518, 1955)
 "Down in the Old School Yard" / "Oh, How I Miss You Tonight" (45 rpm, Bergen 103, c. 1956)
 "Don't Cry Little Girl, Don't Cry" / "The Woodpecker Song" (Instrumental)(45 rpm, Original OR-532, November 1956)
 "Old Oaken Bucket" / "I'm Always Chasing Rainbows" (45 rpm, Anchor 148, November 1958)
 "When Your Hair Has Turned to Silver" / "You Belong to My Heart" (45 rpm, Anchor 150, c. 1958)
 "Down in the Old School Yard" / "Oh, How I Miss You Tonight" (45 rpm, Anchor 152, c. 1958)
 "Somebody Stole My Girl" / "Oh, How I Miss You Tonight" (45 rpm, Anchor 155, c. 1959)
 "Rocka Rolla Old Pianola" / "You Are My Sunshine" (45 rpm, Anchor 156, c. 1959)
 "Maybe" (Instrumental) / "Yes Sir, That's My Baby" (Instrumental) (45 rpm, Anchor 157, c. 1959)
 "Rock a Rolla the Old Pianola" / "Brother Bill" (Original Records?)

Album
 Pica on Pianola (33 rpm, Original  LP-01) [Track listing: "Somebody Stole My Gal" / "(The Gang that Sang) Heart of My Heart" / "Oh How I Miss You Tonight" / "I Want a Girl" / "Yes, Sir, That's My Baby" / "Five Foot Two, Eyes of Blue" / "Maybe" / "Sweet Sue, Just You"]

References

1923 births
1973 deaths
American people of Italian descent
Barringer High School alumni
Musicians from Newark, New Jersey
20th-century American pianists
American male pianists
20th-century American male musicians